The Bolte Bridge is a large twin cantilever road bridge in Melbourne, Victoria, Australia. The Bolte Bridge carries a total of eight lanes of traffic – four lanes northbound and four lanes southbound. While officially only 490 metres in length, the actual structure appears much longer as it forms part of a 5 kilometre elevated roadway between Flemington Road and the West Gate Freeway. It spans the Yarra River and Victoria Harbour in the Docklands precinct to the west of the Melbourne CBD. It forms part of the CityLink system of toll roads that connects the Tullamarine Freeway from the northern suburbs with the West Gate Freeway and the Domain and Burnley tunnels to the Monash Freeway and the south eastern suburbs. It is named after Victoria's 38th and longest-serving Premier, Sir Henry Bolte.

Construction 
The bridge was designed by architects Denton Corker Marshall and was built for head contractor Transurban by Baulderstone Hornibrook, construction taking three years from 1996 to 1999 and costing $75 million. It was named by Jeff Kennett, for former Premier of Victoria, Sir Henry Bolte because of its linking the West Gate, Monash and Tullamarine Freeways—projects commissioned or completed by the Bolte Government.

It is the largest balanced cantilever cast in situ box girder bridge in Australia. The superstructure is built as two independent bridges of variable depth, prestressed concrete box girders, separated by a 1.15 m clear gap between the structures.

These two towers are an aesthetic addition by the architects, and are not joined to the main body of the bridge. These towers are hollow, and feature access ladders to a small roof top hatch. Until locked and surrounded by water, these towers were a popular target for urban explorers. It has two main spans of 173 metres, two side spans of 72 metres with approach viaducts 430m to the south 4080 metres to the north. The bridge supports eight lanes of automobile traffic. Access is prohibited to cyclists and pedestrians.

Other bridges in Australia of similar construction are the Gateway Bridge, Brisbane and Mooney Mooney Bridge near Gosford, north of Sydney.

Gallery

References

External links 
 
 Bolte Bridge and innovative design
 Denton Corker Marshall Profile

Bridges in Melbourne
Cantilever bridges
Bridges completed in 1999
Toll roads in Australia
Toll bridges in Australia
Bridges over the Yarra River
1999 establishments in Australia
Road bridges in Victoria (Australia)
Landmarks in Melbourne
Buildings and structures in the City of Melbourne (LGA)
Transport in the City of Melbourne (LGA)